Sassywood is a form of trial by ordeal still in use in Liberia. There are various types of ordeal. The principal one involves the drinking of a poisonous concoction made of the bark of the Erythrophleum suaveolens tree. Another involves the rubbing of a red-hot machete on the legs of the suspect, while a third involves dipping the suspect's hand into hot oil.

The practice has a long tradition in Liberia. A Reverend Mr. Connelly described it in some detail in "My Report of the Kroo people" in the 1850 book The ... Annual Report of the American Colonization Society ...:
The bark of the sassy-wood is powerfully narcotic, and a strong decoction of this the person is forced to drink ... he either throws off from his stomach the poison, when he is pronounced innocent, or it operates as a cathartic, when he is declared guilty, and compelled to take more of the decoction, and is subjected to other cruelties, which cause his speedy death. ... The ordeal of sassy-wood is therefore made a penalty for all crimes ... the friends of the accused may buy him off from death for different sums of money ...

In October 2009, Assistant Internal Affairs Minister Jangar announced the Liberian government had banned the practice, after the deaths of seven people accused of witchcraft in River Gee County in June, at least two of whom died from drinking the poison, but enforcing this policy is difficult. The Liberian judicial system is in a "decrepit state". A 2007 United Nations Security Council report described it as handicapped by "limited infrastructure, shortage of qualified personnel, lack of capacity to process cases, poor management and lack of the necessary will to institute reforms." There are few working courts in rural areas, and most people have no access to legal counsel, nor do many even know that sassywood is against the law. In stark contrast, sassywood is a quick and easy remedy which can take "less than 30 minutes".

A poison drink ordeal of the same name has also been reported in neighboring Sierra Leone.

References

Law of Liberia
Trial by ordeal